Highway 4 is a major highway in the Canadian province of Saskatchewan. It runs from U.S. Route 191 at the United States border near Monchy to Highway 224 / Highway 904 in Meadow Lake Provincial Park.

Major communities that Highway 4 passes through are Swift Current, Rosetown, Biggar, Battleford, North Battleford, and Meadow Lake. It also passes The Battlefords Provincial Park.

History
Highway 4 was originally designated as Provincial Highway 1, while the present-day Highway 1 was designated as Provincial Highway 4.

Route description

Highway 4S
Several maps, such as MapArt's mapbook of Saskatchewan Cities and Towns shows a Highway 4S spur heading east from the intersection of Highway 4 in Swift Current to the city's airport, following Airport Road. The roadway is not designated Highway 4S on the Saskatchewan Highway's Official Highway Map.

Gallery

Major intersections
From south to north:

References

External links

Saskatchewan Landing Provincial Park
The Battlefords Provincial Park
Meadow Lake Provincial Park

004
Meadow Lake, Saskatchewan
North Battleford
Transport in Swift Current